Andréa Ferréol (born Andrée Louise Ferréol; January 6, 1947) is a French actress and officer of the Ordre national du Mérite (2009).

Her debut was in the 1973 film La Grande bouffe, which made a big scandal at the Cannes Film Festival.

She was the last partner of Egyptian actor Omar Sharif.

Filmography

References

External links

 

1947 births
French film actresses
Living people
People from Aix-en-Provence
Officers of the Ordre national du Mérite
Officiers of the Légion d'honneur
Commandeurs of the Ordre des Arts et des Lettres
French television actresses
20th-century French actresses
21st-century French actresses